Lyudmila Georgievna Zykina (10 June 1929 – 1 July 2009) was a national folk singer of Russia.

She was born in Moscow and joined the Pyatnitsky Choir in 1947. Her surname is derived from the Russian word for "loud" ("зычный"). Beginning in 1960 she performed solo. She befriended Ekaterina Furtseva, the powerful Minister of Culture of the Soviet Union, and was reputed to be a favourite singer of Leonid Brezhnev. It is known she was a particular favourite of both Kim Il-sung and his son Kim Jong-il, performing in Pyongyang six times at the invitation of the Kims. It was also reported that Kim Jong-il was so fond of Zykina that he invited her to Pyongyang in 2008 in hopes that her performance would help him recover from illness. Olga Voronets was considered Zykina's main rival.

Among Zykina's many honors were the Lenin Prize (1970) and Order of Lenin (1979) as well as the titles of People's Artist of the USSR (1973) and Hero of Socialist Labour (1987). According to Dmitri Shostakovich, Zykina was "more than a brilliant interpreter, she was a coauthor, co-creator of composers".

Her signature songs include Techot Volga and Orenburgskii platok. The asteroid 4879 Zykina is named after her. Lyudmila Zykina died on 1 July 2009 after suffering a heart attack.

Honours and awards
 Hero of Socialist Labour, with the Order of Lenin and the "Hammer and Sickle" medal (4 September 4, 1987) – for great contribution to the development of Soviet musical art.
 Order of St. Andrew (12 June 2004) – for outstanding contribution to the development of national culture and music.
 Order of Merit for the Fatherland:
1st class (10 June 2009) – for outstanding contribution to the development of national musical culture and long-term creative and social activities.
2nd class (10 June 1999) – for outstanding achievements in the field of culture and great contributions to the development of a national songwriting.
3rd class (25 March 1997) – for services to the state and the great personal contribution to the development of national musical art.
 Order of Lenin (8 June 1979)
 Order of the Badge of Honour (1967)
 Jubilee Medal "50 Years of Victory in the Great Patriotic War 1941–1945" (1995)
 Medal "In Commemoration of the 850th Anniversary of Moscow" (1997)
 Jubilee Medal "In Commemoration of the 100th Anniversary since the Birth of Vladimir Il'ich Lenin" (1970)
 Medal "Veteran of Labour"
 People's Artist of the USSR
 People's Artist of the RSFSR
 Honoured Artist of the RSFSR
 People's Artist of the Uzbek SSR
 Lenin Prize (1970)

References

External links

 Official Russian website
 Lyudmila Zykina on Softpanorama (YouTube links)
 

1929 births
2009 deaths
Singers from Moscow
Heroes of Socialist Labour
Recipients of the Order "For Merit to the Fatherland", 1st class
Recipients of the Order "For Merit to the Fatherland", 2nd class
Recipients of the Order "For Merit to the Fatherland", 3rd class
People's Artists of the USSR
Recipients of the Order of Lenin
People's Artists of Russia
Honored Artists of the RSFSR
People's Artists of Uzbekistan
Lenin Prize winners
Russian folk singers
Soviet women singers
Gnessin State Musical College alumni
20th-century Russian women singers
20th-century Russian singers
Winners of the Golden Gramophone Award
People's Artists of the Azerbaijan SSR